Azadi Metro Station is a station on Isfahan Metro Line 1. The station opened on 20 July 2017. It is located on Azadi Square, also known as Darvazeh Shiraz (Shiraz Gate). The next station on the north side is Shari'ati Station. The station is located next to University of Isfahan campus.

References

Isfahan Metro stations
Railway stations opened in 2017